The so called Monariu Dacian fortress is the name of the ruined remnants of a Dacian fortified town in Cetate and Monariu, both in Bistrița-Năsăud County, in northern Romania. The actual historical name of the ruined settlement is unknown.

References

Dacian fortresses in Bistrița-Năsăud County
Ancient history of Transylvania